The canton of Baïgura et Mondarrain is an administrative division of the Pyrénées-Atlantiques department, southwestern France. It was created at the French canton reorganisation which came into effect in March 2015. Its seat is in Cambo-les-Bains.

It consists of the following communes:
 
Cambo-les-Bains
Espelette
Halsou
Hasparren
Itxassou
Jatxou
Larressore
Louhossoa
Macaye
Souraïde

References

Cantons of Pyrénées-Atlantiques